Kang Eun-mi (Korean: 강은미; Hanja: 姜恩美; born 6 September 1970) is a South Korean politician. She is currently a member of the 21st National Assembly representing the Justice Party, where she serves as floor leader of the party.

References

External links
Official website 

1970 births
Living people
Members of the National Assembly (South Korea)
21st-century South Korean women politicians
21st-century South Korean politicians
People from Gwangju
Justice Party (South Korea) politicians
South Korean Roman Catholics
Female members of the National Assembly (South Korea)